Blache is a surname. Notable people with the surname include:

Christian Blache (1838–1920) - Danish painter
Greg Blache (born 1949) - American football coach
Gustave Blache III (born 1977) - American artist
Herbert Blaché (1882–1953) - British American film director, producer, and screenwriter
Jean-Baptiste Blache (1765–1834) - German ballet dancer and ballet master

See also 
Alice Guy-Blaché (1873–1968), French film director